Abel Issa Camará (born 6 January 1990) is a Bissau-Guinean professional footballer who plays as a forward for Liga 1 club Arema.

Club career
Born in Bissau, Guinea-Bissau, Camará finished his football grooming with Belenenses in Portugal. He made his senior debut in the 2009–10 season, on loan to Lisbon neighbours Estrela da Amadora in the third division.

Camará subsequently returned to Belenenses, going on to be regularly played in the Segunda Liga by manager José Mota. He then went on to serve several loans, making his Primeira Liga debut during that timeframe with Beira-Mar.

Camará's first season in the Portuguese top flight with his main club was 2014–15, when he scored once in 24 games to help his team to the sixth position, which qualified for the UEFA Europa League. After another loan, now at Saudi Arabia's Al Faisaly, he re-joined Belenenses.

On 1 March 2018, Camará moved from the Cypriot First Division with Pafos to Italy with Cremonese. He made his Serie B debut with the latter 16 days later, playing the last minutes of the 1–1 away draw against Brescia.

On the last day of the 2019 January transfer window, Camará signed with Elazığspor from Irtysh Pavlodar, being one of 22 players to join the Turkish club in just two hours. He left on 18 May.

Camará competed in the Portuguese second tier from 2019 to August 2021, with Feirense and Mafra. He returned to the main division early into the latter season, joining Belenenses SAD.

On 1 July 2022, Arema announced the signing of Camará on a two-year contract. He made his Liga 1 (Indonesia) debut on 30 July, playing the entire 2–1 home win over PSIS Semarang. His first goal was scored two weeks later, in the 2–1 away defeat of Bali United.

International career
On 16 November 2010, Camará played for Guinea-Bissau at the Estádio do Restelo, in a friendly with Cape Verde. Additionally, he appeared in several games for Portugal during the 2013 UEFA European Under-21 Championship qualification campaign.

Camará was selected for the 2017 Africa Cup of Nations by manager Baciro Candé, featuring in three games – starting against Gabon– in an eventual group-stage exit.

Honours
Arema
Indonesia President's Cup: 2022

References

External links

1990 births
Living people
Bissau-Guinean emigrants to Portugal
Portuguese sportspeople of Bissau-Guinean descent
Sportspeople from Bissau
Bissau-Guinean footballers
Portuguese footballers
Association football forwards
Primeira Liga players
Liga Portugal 2 players
Segunda Divisão players
C.F. Os Belenenses players
C.F. Estrela da Amadora players
S.C. Beira-Mar players
C.D. Feirense players
C.D. Mafra players
Belenenses SAD players
Liga I players
FC Petrolul Ploiești players
Saudi Professional League players
Al-Faisaly FC players
Cypriot First Division players
Pafos FC players
Serie B players
U.S. Cremonese players
Kazakhstan Premier League players
FC Irtysh Pavlodar players
TFF First League players
Elazığspor footballers
Liga 1 (Indonesia) players
Arema F.C. players
Portugal under-21 international footballers
Guinea-Bissau international footballers
2017 Africa Cup of Nations players
Bissau-Guinean expatriate footballers
Expatriate footballers in Portugal
Expatriate footballers in Romania
Expatriate footballers in Saudi Arabia
Expatriate footballers in Cyprus
Expatriate footballers in Italy
Expatriate footballers in Kazakhstan
Expatriate footballers in Turkey
Expatriate footballers in Indonesia
Bissau-Guinean expatriate sportspeople in Romania
Bissau-Guinean expatriate sportspeople in Saudi Arabia
Bissau-Guinean expatriate sportspeople in Cyprus
Bissau-Guinean expatriate sportspeople in Italy
Bissau-Guinean expatriate sportspeople in Kazakhstan
Bissau-Guinean expatriate sportspeople in Turkey
Expatriate sportspeople in Indonesia